Tinajeros is a barangay of Malabon in the Philippines.

Industry
There are two candle manufacturers: Sevilla Candle Factory and Liwanag Candles (Bahay Liwanag).

Education
Tinajeros Elementary School
Guillermo S. Sanchez Memorial Elementary School
Tinajeros National High School - located at B. Rivera St. Tinajeros Malabon 
Asian Science and Technological Institute (under New Professional Education Management Group) - TESDA accredited
SME - a private elementary school
Bon Little Angels Academy
Nazirites Christian Academy
Village Democracy Education and Development Center (promoting peaceful, progressive, productive and innovative local communities) - TESDA accreditation ongoing
Bright Beginnings Center for Young Children

Religion
Roman Catholic - Holy Trinity and Holy Cross Chapel (feast day: Trinity Sunday)
Iglesia ni Cristo
Malabon International Baptist Church, led by Bishop Pio Tica
Sacrum Krishma Healing and Meditation Ministry

References

External links
 Official city government website

Barangays of Metro Manila
Malabon